Commander, Carrier Strike Group 8, abbreviated as CCSG-8 or COMCARSTRKGRU 8, is one of five U.S. Navy carrier strike groups currently assigned to the United States Fleet Forces Command.  the group flagship is the Nimitz-class aircraft carrier . , the other units of the group are the guided-missile cruiser , Carrier Air Wing One, the ships of Destroyer Squadron 28 as well as the Royal Norwegian Navy's frigate HNoMS Fridtjof Nansen (F310), which joined the strike group for one deployment.

The group was placed under NATO command as a result of the buildup of Russian forces on the Ukrainian border prior to the 2022 Russian invasion of Ukraine.

History

During 1994,  was a unit of Carrier Group 8.
During 1999, the previous Carrier Group 8's flagship was Eisenhower.

In May and June 1998, Vella Gulf completed a two-month BALTOPS Cruise, taking part in the 26th annual maritime exercise BALTOPS '98 in the Western Baltic Sea from 8–19 June 1998. During the exercise, Commander, Carrier Group 8, commanded the exercise from the ship.

From November 2001, at the commencement of Multinational Interception Force (MIF) operations in the Persian Gulf, Royal Australian Navy ships came under the control ('chopped to the OPCON') of Commander Carrier Group 8, Rear Admiral Mark P. Fitzgerald. Fitzgerald was also serving as Commander Task Force 50 (CTF 50) embarked in the carrier .

The group was established by redesignation of the former Carrier Group 8 on 1 October 2004.

The Strike Group deployed on 2 January 2010 to the Middle East to help with operations by the U.S. 5th and 6th Fleets.

Effective 1 October 2012, when not deployed, Carrier Strike Group 8 is part of the U.S. Fleet Forces Command, and its commander reports to Commander Task Force 80, the director of Fleet Forces' Maritime Headquarters. Carrier Strike Group 8 is designated Task Group 80.3.

On 6 October 2014, U.S. Fleet Forces Command announced that the Carrier Strike Group 8 command staff would deploy with Truman, instead of Eisenhower, in accordance with the U.S. Navy's Optimized Fleet Response Plan (O-FRP). This change does not affect the other ships or units that are otherwise assigned to either strike groups.

On 24 January 2022 it was announced that the strike group had been placed under NATO command for planned exercises in the Mediterranean Sea. This was the first time a full US carrier strike group had been placed under NATO command since the Cold War.

Past Commanders
 Rear Admiral Jay L. Johnson
 Rear Admiral Charles S. Abbot, May 1994 - July 1995
 Rear Admiral William J. Fallon, July 1995 - February 1996
 Rear Admiral Gregory G. Johnson, February 1996 - August 1997
 Rear Admiral Mark P. Fitzgerald
 Rear Admiral George E. Mayer
 Rear Admiral H. Denby Starling II, July 2003 - July 2004
 Rear Admiral William J. McCarthy, July 2004 - July 2005
 Rear Admiral Allen G. Myers, July 2005 - June 2007
 Rear Admiral Philip H. Cullom
 Rear Admiral Kurt W. Tidd
 Rear Admiral Philip S. Davidson
 Rear Admiral Michael C. Manazir, September 2011 - June 2013
 Rear Admiral Michael M. Gilday, June 2013 - June 2014
 Rear Admiral Victorino G. Mercado, June 2014 - April 2015
 Rear Admiral Bret C. Batchelder, April 2015 - July 2016
 Rear Admiral Dale E. Horan, July 2016 - September 2017
 Rear Admiral Eugene H. Black III, September 2017 - April 2019
 Rear Admiral Andrew J. Loiselle, April 2019 - June 2020
 Rear Admiral Ryan B. Scholl, June 2020 - August 2021
 Rear Admiral Curt A. Renshaw, August 2021 - May 2022
 Rear Admiral Paul C. Spedero Jr., May 2022 - present

Carrier Air Wing

Carrier Air Wing One comprises:
Strike Fighter Squadron 11, (VFA-11)
Strike Fighter Squadron 81, (VFA-81)
Strike Fighter Squadron 34, (VFA-34)
Strike Fighter Squadron 211, (VFA-211)
Carrier Airborne Early Warning Squadron 126, (VAW-126)
Electronic attack Squadron 140, (VAQ-137)
Fleet Logistics Support Squadron 40 Det. 2, (VRC-40)
Helicopter Sea Combat Squadron 11, (HSC-11)
Helicopter Maritime Strike Squadron 72, (HSM-72)

Aircraft operated

F/A-18E/F Super Hornet
EA-18 Growler
E-2C Hawkeye
C-2A Greyhound
MH-60S Seahawk
MH-60R Seahawk

Notes

References

External links
 Projected new Fleet Response Plan

Carrier Strike Groups
Military in Norfolk, Virginia
Military units and formations established in 2004